Heliophanus gloriosus is a jumping spider species in the genus Heliophanus.  It was first described by Wanda Wesołowska in 1986 and lives in Angola and Botswana.

References

Salticidae
Spiders of Africa
Arthropods of Angola
Arthropods of Botswana
Spiders described in 1986
Taxa named by Wanda Wesołowska